Patras Yusaf was the Bishop of the Roman Catholic Diocese of Multan from 1984 until his death in 1998.

Yusaf was born in Francisabad, Pakistan on 29 July 1936. He received his religious training at the Christ the King Seminary (Pakistan) and was ordained a priest on 29 December 1965.

He was appointed as vicar general of Faisalabad diocese in 1970. He obtained a degree in moral theology in Rome in 1976, after which he taught at Christ the King Seminary in Karachi. He also wrote a book in the Urdu language on the Christian family. He served as the fourth national director of Caritas Pakistan from 1986 to 1998.

On 19 Dec 1981 Pope John Paul II appointed him Auxiliary Bishop of Multan. He was Ordained Bishop on 19 February 1982. He was appointed Bishop of Multan on 20 October 1984.

In 1989 he also served on the Muslim Christian Dialogue and Major Seminary commissions of the Catholic Bishops' Conference of Pakistan.

On December 28, 1990, he celebrated the silver jubilee of his priestly ordination, with Mass at the Holy Redeemer Cathedral in Multan

In 1998, Bishop Patras became ill with diabetes and high blood pressure. Pope John Paul II appointed Father Raymond Saeed apostolic administrator for the Diocese.

Bishop Patras died on 29 December 1998. His funeral service on January 13, 1998, was led by Bishop Joseph Coutts of Faisalabad in Yusaf´s native village of Francisabad. He was buried in the compound of Multan's Holy Redeemer Cathedral.

References

20th-century Roman Catholic bishops in Pakistan
1936 births
1998 deaths
Roman Catholic bishops of Multan